Earthfasts may refer to:

 Earthfast is old English for post in ground construction, for example prehistoric megalithic monuments that were built for some long-lost religious purpose. Most are in desolate places. They are earthfast, that is, they are visible on the surface, but are fast in the earth.
 Earthfasts trilogy by William Mayne, comprising Earthfasts, Cradlefasts and Candlefasts, an unusual evocation of the King Arthur legend.
 Earthfasts (TV series), a 1994 BBC children's drama based on the book by William Mayne